Amber Scorah is a Canadian-American writer, speaker, and activist.

Early life 
Scorah grew up as a third-generation Jehovah's Witness in Vancouver, Canada with her parents and sister. She rarely had contact with non-Jehovah's Witnesses. She forwent a formal education and career, and instead went into the full-time volunteer preaching work immediately after graduating high school. When she was 22 years old she married a Jehovah's Witness elder, then she and her husband moved to China to become missionaries.

Education 
As a young adult, Scorah forwent a formal education after high school (see early life above). In 2010 she enrolled in college at CUNY's Brooklyn and Hunter colleges. She took a break in 2015, then resumed her studies in spring 2019. She is currently enrolled in CUNY BA's program for Unique and Interdisciplinary Studies. She is concentrating in the Psychology of Religion at Hunter College's program in religion, under the guidance of faculty member Barbara Sproul.

ChinesePod and "Dear Amber" 
Scorah is a fluent speaker of Mandarin Chinese and has lived in both Taiwan and China, where she became immersed in Chinese culture. Between the years 2007 and 2009 she hosted a ChinesePod series called "Dear Amber" where she answered listeners' questions about China and discussed unique aspects of Chinese culture and customs which foreigners may not be aware of. ChinesePod describes Scorah as a "pioneer" for developing this new lesson style.

Child care and parental leave advocacy 
In 2015 Scorah's three-month-old son Karl Towndrow died unexpectedly on his first day of daycare in SoHo, New York. The daycare had been operating without a license and was shut down shortly after the incident. A staff member stated that she had noticed Karl kicking in his crib but she was told by a supervisor to ignore it because that's what babies do. He was found unresponsive with "blue lips" a short time later, and pronounced dead at the hospital. Scorah had not felt ready to go back to work and leave him at daycare, which made the incident particularly difficult to cope with. She walked into the daycare and witnessed a staff member administering CPR "incorrectly," despite their earlier assurances that the staff was properly trained to administer CPR. She later found out that he had been put to sleep on his side. Since the official cause of death was "undetermined," she does not know if it could have been prevented; however, she regrets that her son had to die alone without his mother. The incident drove her into activism.

Letter grading 
In a joint press conference with senators Jeffrey D. Klein and Diane Savino, Scorah and her partner Lee Towndrow pushed for the city and state of New York to institute a letter grading system for child care facilities. She feels that a letter grading system could prevent more deaths in the future because parents would have more tools available to assess a given daycare's safety and qualifications.

Paid parental leave 
Scorah authored a "viral" article for The New York Times Motherlode blog about the incident from her perspective. In it she explained why she thinks mandatory paid parental leave is necessary. She says, "Parental leave reduces infant death, gives us healthier, more well-adjusted adults and helps women stay in the workforce." First lady Michelle Obama was so moved by her story that she sent a letter of condolence to Scorah. Soon thereafter Barack Obama's senior adviser Valerie Jarrett made a push for legislation mandating paid family leave. In February 2016 Scorah attended New York City mayor Bill de Blasio's speech where he discussed his policy mandating 6 weeks' paid parental leave for non-union city employees, and pushed for the policy to be made available throughout the state of New York. Scorah called this policy change a "baby step." In August 2016 Scorah delivered petitions to both the Trump and Clinton presidential campaigns pushing for federally mandated paid leave. Both politicians have spoken favorably of the concept. Donald Trump pitched a plan for how he could institute 6 weeks' paid parental leave. Scorah says this is progress but it's not enough. In 2017 CNN correspondent Clare Sebastian named Amber as her "hero" for "...her bravery in turning such a tragic event into public and heartfelt campaign." That same year Brooklyn Magazine named her one of their top "100 Influencers in Brooklyn Culture" for her parental leave advocacy.

High-control groups 
Scorah began speaking out publicly about her life as a Jehovah's Witness in 2013 in her article Leaving the Witness: A Preacher Finds Freedom To Think In Totalitarian China published by The Believer magazine. In it she speaks about her restrictive childhood and disfellowshipment as a teenager, her life as an illegal missionary in China (see persecution of Jehovah's Witnesses in China), her gradual change of belief, and her eventual apostasy trial and shunning. In 2019 she expounded on this story in her memoir Leaving the Witness.

List of works

Books

Podcasts

References 

Year of birth missing (living people)
Living people
Canadian Jehovah’s Witness missionaries
Canadian emigrants to the United States
Writers from Vancouver
21st-century Canadian women writers
Christian missionaries in Taiwan
Christian missionaries in China
Canadian expatriates in Taiwan
Canadian expatriates in China
People disfellowshipped by the Jehovah's Witnesses
City University of New York alumni